Nolan Foote (born November 29, 2000) is an American-born Canadian professional ice hockey forward for the  New Jersey Devils of the National Hockey League (NHL). He was drafted 27th overall by the Tampa Bay Lightning in the first round of the 2019 NHL Entry Draft. He is the son of former defenseman Adam Foote and the brother of Nashville Predators defenseman Callan Foote.

Playing career
Foote was selected by the Kelowna Rockets in the 2015 Western Hockey League Draft with the 43rd overall pick, while playing with the Colorado Thunderbirds at the T1EHL under-16 level. Foote's older brother Cal was previously selected by the Rockets in the 2013 draft.

On June 21, 2019, Foote was selected by the Tampa Bay Lightning 27th overall in the 2019 NHL Entry Draft. Foote again joined his brother Cal in being selected by the same franchise. Cal was previously selected by the Lightning in the 2017 NHL Entry Draft. Prior to being drafted, Foote played the past three seasons in the WHL for the Rockets. Foote has skated in 168 career games, recording 68 goals, 70 assists and 138 points.

On June 25, 2019, Foote was signed to a three-year, entry-level contract with the Tampa Bay Lightning.

On February 16, 2020, his contract rights, along with a first round pick in the 2020 NHL Entry Draft, were traded to the New Jersey Devils in exchange for forward Blake Coleman.  He started the 2020–21 season with the Binghamton Devils of the American Hockey League and was called up to the New Jersey Devils' taxi squad on April 17, 2021.  He made his NHL debut the following day against the New York Rangers, and recorded his first NHL point in that game by assisting on a goal by Nico Hischier.

Career statistics

Regular season and playoffs

International

References

External links
 

2000 births
Living people
Binghamton Devils players
Canadian ice hockey centres
American ice hockey centers
American people of Canadian descent
Kelowna Rockets players
National Hockey League first-round draft picks
New Jersey Devils players
People from Englewood, Colorado
Tampa Bay Lightning draft picks
Utica Comets players